Robert T. Braithwaite (born 1950) is a United States magistrate judge of the United States District Court for the District of Utah.

Early life and education
Robert Braithwaite  was born in 1950 in Ithaca, New York, and graduated from Cedar City High School in Cedar City, Utah in 1968. He attended the University of Utah for his bachelor's degree. He then returned to the University of Utah and received his law degree from the University of Utah College of Law in 1976. Braithwaite was raised in Cedar City, and held summer jobs washing dishes at the North Rim of the Grand Canyon at age sixteen for seventy cents an hour plus room and board. He also worked as part of a survey crew, a pipe inspector, a receptionist at an information kiosk at the Smithsonian in Washington D. C., and elevator operator at the Washington Monument. He spent six years with the Army National Guard in artillery, and United States Army Reserve (Judge Advocate General's Corps).

Legal career
Braithwaite was a private practice lawyer working solo in a Cedar City law firm. He also served as City Attorney for Cedar City, Parowan City, and Springdale, and as Deputy County Attorney for Iron County before his appointment to the bench.

Judicial career
Braithwaite was appointed to the Utah Fifth Circuit Court in July 1987 by Governor Norman H. Bangerter, and then to the Fifth Judicial District Court in January 1992. In 1996 he was successfully retained in office by Utah voters. He retired from his state court position in 2003, when he became a part-time federal magistrate judge. He serves Beaver, Iron, and Washington counties. He was appointed to this position on May 7, 2003. As a magistrate judge, Justice Braithwaite has presided over the discovery and other preliminary matters in many court cases including USA v. McLaws, USA v. Gwinn, USA v. Walters, USA v. Kros, USA v. Crowley, USA v. Birch, USA v. Chamberlain and USA v. Johnson. As a state trial judge he heard thousands of cases, including everything from parking tickets, to divorce, probate, and capital homicides.  State v. Honie was one of the latter.  He sat as a pro tem judge on three Utah Supreme Court cases, authoring a dissent in Platt v. Torrey. Braithwaite presided over two other important homicide cases, State v. Beatty, and State v. Wilcken.  Both were plea bargains, but that took place after extensive pretrial hearings.
He has also adjudicated a number of various cases including the trial of a man who was convicted of operating an off-road vehicle on federal land. Judge Braithwaite released a prominent St. George businessman from custody following his arrest and indictment in New York on a multibillion-dollar online gambling conspiracy. Judge Braithwaite ordered the man to surrender his passport and be supervised by pretrial services while awaiting trial on the criminal charge.

Community and professional service
Judge Braithwaite was a member of the Utah Air Conservation Committee from 1977 to 1985. He is a former member of the Board of Circuit Court Judges. He is a past member of the Utah Judicial Council and served as Chairman of its Policy and Planning Committee.

References

1950 births
Living people
University of Utah alumni
Utah lawyers
People from Iron County, Utah
United States magistrate judges
S.J. Quinney College of Law alumni